The Second Presbyterian Church, founded in 1756 and incorporated in 1784 as the Scotch Presbyterian Church, is a church in Manhattan, New York City.

History 
It built a sanctuary on the south side of Cedar Street, between Broadway and Nassau Street, in 1768. In 1837, the congregation moved to Grand Street. Today their sanctuary is located in a 16-story apartment building at 360 Central Park West.   

In 1892, the church built a traditional sanctuary with Manse and School building between 95th and 96th Streets and Central Park West. Following mergers early in the 20th century, in 1917, the congregation changed its name officially to Second Presbyterian Church. In 1928, the decision was made to demolish the existing buildings for a new sanctuary in an apartment building designed by Rosario Candela.

References

External links
 

Presbyterian organizations established in the 18th century
Former Presbyterian churches in New York City
Demolished churches in New York City
Demolished buildings and structures in Manhattan